The Oregon Portland Cement Building is a building in southeast Portland, Oregon listed on the National Register of Historic Places.

Further reading

See also
 National Register of Historic Places listings in Southeast Portland, Oregon

References

External links
 

1929 establishments in Oregon
Buckman, Portland, Oregon
Industrial buildings and structures on the National Register of Historic Places in Portland, Oregon
Industrial buildings completed in 1929
Portland Eastside MPS
Portland Historic Landmarks